Henrique Dinis Oliveira Dias (born 21 January 1990), known as Dinis, is a Portuguese former professional footballer who played as a defensive midfielder.

Club career
Born in Monção, Viana do Castelo District, Dinis joined Vitória SC's youth system at the age of 14. His Primeira Liga input with the first team consisted of 13 minutes in a 3–2 home win against Académica de Coimbra, on 23 May 2009; previously, in September 2007, the 17-year-old had signed his first professional contract.

In the following four years, whilst serving as many loans, Dinis could only total 41 games for Gondomar SC, A.D. Lousada (both in the third division), Deportivo de La Coruña B (Spanish Segunda División B) and C.D. Trofense (Segunda Liga). Additionally, in both his country's second and third tiers, he played just four matches for Guimarães' reserves over the course of two seasons.

In August 2014, Dinis signed with Delhi Dynamos FC from the Indian Super League. His maiden appearance in the competition took place on 1 November, as he played the second half of the 2–1 away loss to FC Goa.

Dinis started the 2014–15 campaign with Croatian club NK Istra 1961. He made his competitive debut on 20 February 2015 in a 2–1 defeat at NK Slaven Belupo where came on as a second-half substitute for Neven Vukman, being released in mid-October by mutual consent after appearing in nine matches in all competitions.

International career
Dinis earned 28 caps for Portugal at youth level. His only match with the under-21s occurred on 9 February 2011, when he featured 45 minutes in a 3–1 friendly win over Sweden.

Personal life
On 26 June 2014, Dinis earned praise in Portugal from both the media and non-governmental organizations after saving the lives of two Spanish fishermen who were drowning in the Minho river.

Career statistics

References

External links

National team data 

1990 births
Living people
People from Monção
Sportspeople from Viana do Castelo District
Portuguese footballers
Association football midfielders
Primeira Liga players
Liga Portugal 2 players
Segunda Divisão players
Vitória S.C. players
Gondomar S.C. players
A.D. Lousada players
C.D. Trofense players
Vitória S.C. B players
C.D. Cinfães players
Segunda División B players
Deportivo Fabril players
Indian Super League players
Odisha FC players
Croatian Football League players
NK Istra 1961 players
Portugal youth international footballers
Portugal under-21 international footballers
Portuguese expatriate footballers
Expatriate footballers in Spain
Expatriate footballers in India
Expatriate footballers in Croatia
Portuguese expatriate sportspeople in Spain
Portuguese expatriate sportspeople in India
Portuguese expatriate sportspeople in Croatia